Ullibarri-Viña or Uribarri-Dibiña is a hamlet and council located in the municipality of Vitoria-Gasteiz, in Álava province, Basque Country, Spain. As of 2020, it has a population of 40.

Geography 
Ullívarri Viñaes is located 8km west-northwest of Vitoria-Gasteiz.

References

Populated places in Álava